In Māori mythology, Matuku-tangotango (Matuku) is an ogre who kills Wahieroa the son of Tāwhaki. In some versions, Matuku lives in a cave called Putawarenuku. Rātā, the son of Wahieroa, sets off to avenge his murdered father, and arrives at last at Matuku's village. He hears from Matuku's servant that at the new moon his master can be killed at the pool where he washes his face and hair. When the new moon has come, Rātā waits until the ogre comes out of his cave and is leaning over with his head in the pool. He grabs him by the hair and kills him. Rātā then sets off to rescue his father's bones from the Ponaturi. A South Island version names the islands where Matuku lives as Puorunuku and Puororangi and also states that Rātā nooses Matuku as he comes out of his lair to perform certain rituals (Tregear 1891:232, 399-400).

Names and epithets
Matuku (bittern)
Matuku-tangotango ('tangotango' perhaps means 'dark as night', or 'ominous')
Matuku-takotako (South Island dialect).

Notes

References
E. R. Tregear, Maori-Polynesian Comparative Dictionary (Lyon and Blair: Lambton Quay), 1891.
John White: The Ancient History of the Maori. Wellington, 1887. vol. 1, pp. 68–69, 90; 78 [These references are supplied (along with the gist of their contents) in :- Martha Beckwith : Hawaiian Mythology. 1940. p. 260, fns. 11-12]

Māori legendary creatures